Acer erythranthum is a species of maple, endemic to Vietnam where it grows on elevations of .

References

erythranthum
Endemic flora of Vietnam
Trees of Vietnam
Near threatened plants
Taxonomy articles created by Polbot